Highland Ridge Wilderness is a  wilderness area in the southern part of the Snake Range of White Pine County, just south of Great Basin National Park, in the U.S. state of Nevada.

The topography of Highland Ridge Wilderness varies from gently sloping bajadas to rolling foothills to steep ridgelines.  This variety of terrain provides excellent habitat for wildlife including mule deer, cougar, northern goshawk, and several species of bat.  The pinyon and juniper-covered mountains, steep rocky ridges, and deep drainages provide contiguous protection to some of the basin lands that comprise much of this region of the state.

See also
 List of wilderness areas in Nevada
 List of U.S. Wilderness Areas
 Wilderness Act

References

External links
 Highland Ridge Wilderness map and fact sheet - Nevada BLM
 Highland Ridge Wilderness - Friends of Nevada Wilderness
Highland Ridge Wilderness- Wilderness Connect

Wilderness areas of Nevada
Protected areas of White Pine County, Nevada
Bureau of Land Management areas in Nevada